Option Verdun/Montréal (OVM) was a municipal political party in Montreal, Quebec, Canada. The party contested seats on the Verdun borough council in the 2013 Montreal municipal election.

Party leader
OVM is led by André Savard, who was also its candidate for borough mayor in 2013. Savard had previously been elected as a borough councillor for Desmarchais-Crawford in the 2005 Montreal municipal election as a candidate of the Montreal Island Citizens Union (MICU) and was returned in the 2009 Montreal municipal election for the renamed Union Montreal. During his second term, he served as chair of the borough's public works, traffic, and public safety and security committee. Savard left Union Montreal in late November 2012 after allegations of illegal fundraising were made before the Charbonneau Commission.

2013 election
After serving for serving months as an independent, Savard formed OVM in 2013. During that year's municipal campaign, he outlined his party's approaches on matters such as poverty reduction and social housing.

Savard was defeated in the mayoral contest, and none of the OVM's candidates for city council and borough council were elected.

The party was dissolved and ceased to be recognized by the Directeur général des élections du Québec on June 1, 2015.

Election results

References

Municipal political parties in Montreal
2013 establishments in Quebec
Political parties established in 2013